Dawn was an Australian magazine created by the New South Wales Aborigines Welfare Board and aimed at Aboriginal Australians. It ran monthly from January 1952 until December 1968. Two issues were published in 1969, before the disbanding of the Aboriginal Welfare Board led to the publication ceasing.

In 1953, E. J. Morgan, manager of Moree Aboriginal Station, wrote of the beneficial effects that the magazine had had on the Aboriginal people, including a better attitude towards the board and less interest in  Communism. He reported that it was very popular and he felt that Dawn had "broken through the apathetic acceptance of their humble state, stimulated their self-respect, and their urge to achieve recognition in the general community", through reading about Aboriginal people who had achieved success in sports and other walks of life. It was described by Superintendent A. W. G. Lipscomb, Superintendent of the board, as a successful experiment:

The magazine was relaunched in April 1970 under the title New Dawn, published by the New South Wales Department of Child Welfare and Social Welfare. It continued to be produced on a monthly basis; production slowed in 1974 and a final issue was published in July 1975.

Availability
The Australian Indigenous Index, or INFOKOORI, is an online index to the fortnightly newspaper Koori Mail as well as to biographical information from various magazines, including all issues of Dawn and New Dawn. Back copies of both Dawn and New Dawn are available on the AIATSIS website, free for use.

References

External links
 (about Brian Syron)

1952 establishments in Australia
Magazines published in Australia
Publications established in 1952
Indigenous Australian mass media